Areca gurita is an extant species of single-stemmed palm tree (genus Areca) indigenous to the Malaysian state of Sarawak on Borneo. Following Heatubun's identification of A. gurita in 2011, he recorded specimens in the vicinity of Kota Padawan, Kampong Patak, and Kampung Siburan, south of Kuching.

References

Bibliography

gurita
Endemic flora of Borneo
Flora of Sarawak
Fruits originating in Asia
Plants described in 2011
Tropical fruit